The 1973 Federation Cup was the 11th edition of the most important competition between national teams in women's tennis. 30 nations participated in the tournament, which was held at the Bad Homburg Tennis Club in Bad Homburg, West Germany from 30 April–6 May. Australia  defeated South Africa in the final, winning the title without losing a rubber.

Participating Teams

Draw
All ties were played at the Bad Homburg Tennis Club in Bad Homburg, West Germany on clay courts.

First round
Japan vs. Ireland

New Zealand vs. Indonesia

United States vs. Italy

Norway vs. South Korea

Spain vs. Canada

South Africa vs. Greece

Switzerland vs. Belgium

Denmark vs. Yugoslavia

Netherlands vs. France

Sweden vs. Argentina

Romania vs. Brazil

Mexico vs. Austria

Second round
Australia vs. Japan

Luxembourg vs. Indonesia

United States vs. South Korea

Spain vs. West Germany

South Africa vs. Belgium

Denmark vs. Netherlands

Sweden vs. Romania

Mexico vs. Great Britain

Quarterfinals
Australia vs. Indonesia

United States vs. West Germany

South Africa vs. Netherlands

Romania vs. Great Britain

Semifinals
Australia vs. West Germany

South Africa vs. Romania

Final
Australia vs. South Africa

Consolation Round
Teams which lost in the first or second round of the main draw went on to play in the Consolation Round.

Draw
{{5RoundBracket-Byes
| RD1=Consolation first round3 May
| RD2=Consolation second round3 May
| RD3=Consolation Quarterfinals4 May
| RD4=Consolation Semifinals5 May
| RD5=Consolation final6 May

| RD1-seed13=
| RD1-team13=
| RD1-score13=2
| RD1-seed14=
| RD1-team14=
| RD1-score14=1

| RD1-seed15=
| RD1-team15=
| RD1-score15=3
| RD1-seed16=
| RD1-team16=
| RD1-score16=0

| RD1-seed17=
| RD1-team17=
| RD1-score17=3
| RD1-seed18=
| RD1-team18=
| RD1-score18=0

| RD1-seed19=
| RD1-team19=
| RD1-score19=3
| RD1-seed20=
| RD1-team20=
| RD1-score20=0

| RD2-seed01=
| RD2-team01=
| RD2-score01=3
| RD2-seed02=
| RD2-team02=
| RD2-score02=0

| RD2-seed03=
| RD2-team03= 
| RD2-score03=w/o
| RD2-seed04=
| RD2-team04=
| RD2-score04=

| RD2-seed05=
| RD2-team05=
| RD2-score05=2
| RD2-seed06=
| RD2-team06=
| RD2-score06=1

| RD2-seed07=
| RD2-team07=
| RD2-score07=0
| RD2-seed08=
| RD2-team08=
| RD2-score08=2

| RD2-seed09=
| RD2-team09=
| RD2-score09=2
| RD2-seed10=
| RD2-team10=
| RD2-score10=0

| RD2-seed11=
| RD2-team11=
| RD2-score11=0
| RD2-seed12=
| RD2-team12=
| RD2-score12=3

| RD2-seed13= 
| RD2-team13=
| RD2-score13=2
| RD2-seed14=
| RD2-team14=
| RD2-score14=1

| RD2-seed15=
| RD2-team15=
| RD2-score15=0
| RD2-seed16=
| RD2-team16=
| RD2-score16=2

| RD3-seed01=
| RD3-team01=
| RD3-score01=2
| RD3-seed02=
| RD3-team02=
| RD3-score02=1

| RD3-seed03=
| RD3-team03=
| RD3-score03=1
| RD3-seed04=
| RD3-team04=
| RD3-score04=2

| RD3-seed05=
| RD3-team05=
| RD3-score05=2
| RD3-seed06=
| RD3-team06=
| RD3-score06=0

| RD3-seed07=
| RD3-team07=
| RD3-score07=0
| RD3-seed08=
| RD3-team08=
| RD3-score08=3

| RD4-seed01=
| RD4-team01=
| RD4-score01=2
| RD4-seed02=
| RD4-team02=
| RD4-score02=1

| RD4-seed03=
| RD4-team03=
| RD4-score03=1
| RD4-seed04=
| RD4-team04=
| RD4-score04=2

| RD5-seed01=
| RD5-team01=
| RD5-score01=2''
| RD5-seed02=
| RD5-team02=
| RD5-score02=1
}}

First roundBelgium vs. New ZealandSouth Korea vs. SwitzerlandFrance vs. DenmarkLuxembourg vs. BrazilSecond roundSweden vs. CanadaSpain vs. ItalyBelgium vs. South KoreaFrance vs. BrazilGreece vs. IrelandAustria vs. YugoslaviaArgentina vs. JapanQuarterfinalsSweden vs. NorwaySouth Korea vs. SpainFrance vs. IrelandAustria vs. JapanSemifinalsSweden vs. South KoreaFrance vs. JapanFinalSweden vs. Japan'''

References

Billie Jean King Cups by year
Federation Cup
Federation Cup
Federation Cup
Federation Cup
Federation Cup
Federation Cup
Federation Cup
Federation Cup